Jimmy Bartlett (born 29 December 1907, date of death unknown) was a Canadian long-distance runner. He competed in the marathon at the 1936 Summer Olympics.

References

External links
 

1907 births
Year of death missing
Athletes (track and field) at the 1936 Summer Olympics
Athletes (track and field) at the 1938 British Empire Games
Canadian male long-distance runners
Canadian male marathon runners
Olympic track and field athletes of Canada
Sportspeople from Oshawa